Narses (478-573) was a general under the Emperor Justinian I who led the reconquest of Italy.

Narses may also refer to:
Narses (comes), also general of Justinian I and brother of Aratius
Narses (magister militum per Orientem), a general under the Emperor Maurice at the end of the sixth century

See also
Narsai (disambiguation)
Narseh, a Sassanid King of Persia
Narsieh, son of Prince Peroz and grandson of Yazdgerd III, the last king of the Sassanid empire
Nerse of Iberia or Nerses of Iberia, 8th-century Georgian prince
Nerses (disambiguation)